Winter Hours were one of New Jersey's leading alternative rock bands. They were formed as an evolution of another, short-lived band named Ward 8 in 1983.  They released two albums and four EPs and toured incessantly before disbanding in 1991. In 1989, their song "Smoke Rings" peaked at number 12 on Billboards Modern Rock Tracks chart.

References

Musical groups established in 1983
Musical groups disestablished in 1991
Alternative rock groups from New Jersey
Chrysalis Records artists
Musical groups from New Jersey
People from Lyndhurst, New Jersey